Pendino is one of the 30 quartieri of Naples, southern Italy.

It covers an area of 0.63 km2 and in 2009 had a population of 15,588 inhabitants.

The neighbourhood is part of the historical city centre (Centro historico), including the Palazzo Como, that houses the Filangieri Civic Museum, on the main north–south street in the area, Via Duomo (the street on which Naples Cathedral is located). The area was one of the most heavily affected by the risanamento, the massive demolitions of the urban renewal of Naples on either side of the year 1900, including the dismantling and repositioning of the aforementioned museum and the very construction of the street, Via Duomo, itself, to provide a main traffic artery to connect the northern side of Naples with the port area.

References

Further reading
 A. Savino, 1984: Narrate uomini la vostra storia. Milano: Adelphi
 F. M. Snowden, 1995: Naples in the Time of Cholera 1884-1911. CUP (online version)

Quartieri of Naples